Calico Light Weapons Inc. (CLWS) is an American privately held  manufacturing company based in Elgin, Oregon that designs, develops and manufactures semiautomatic firearms. It was established in 1982 in Bakersfield, California, and released its first production weapon in 1985. In 1998 its operations were moved to Sparks, Nevada, where replacement parts for existing weapons were produced.

In 2006, it was sold once again and moved to Hillsboro, Oregon, where full firearm production resumed. It implemented a CNC machining process and upgraded materials used in manufacture. There were also minor redesigns of some production models to increase durability and reliability.

Products
CLWS produces a line of pistols and pistol-caliber carbines that feature a top-mounted helical-feed 50- or 100-round magazine that ejects spent shells from a bottom port, making a brass catcher practical in various situations. Nine millimeter pistols, carbines and submachineguns use the roller-delayed blowback principle used in the Heckler & Koch series of firearms.

At the 2012 SHOT Show, Calico exhibited a prototype 12-gauge shotgun with top-mounted helical magazine.

Projects and operations

Calico is working to secure military and law enforcement and export contracts. Its firearms have appeared in several action and science fiction films, including Spaceballs, I Come in Peace and some James Bond films, due to their futuristic appearance. The company's motto is A Revolution in Firepower!

Calico is one of the largest manufacturers of large (50- and 100-round) magazines for automatic and semi-automatic weapons.

Products
Current
.22 LR pistols
Calico M110
.22 LR rifles
Calico M100S & M-100 tactical
M-100FS & M-100FS tactical
9 mm pistols
Calico Liberty III & Liberty III tactical
9 mm rifles
Liberty I and II
Liberty I and II tactical
Calico M960 (military and law enforcement only)
Calico M960A

Discontinued
.22 LR pistols
M-100P
9 mm pistols
M950
Carbines
M-900
M-951
Sub-machineguns
M-750
M-900A
M-950A

Cancelled
Shotgun
Calico 12-gauge shotgun

See also
 List of companies based in Oregon

References

External links
 Calico Official Web Site
 Modern Firearms Calico SMGs site

Firearm manufacturers of the United States
Companies established in 1982
Privately held companies based in Oregon
Union County, Oregon
1982 establishments in California